Blerekvatnet is a lake in the municipality of Rana in Nordland county, Norway.  It lies at the northern base of the mountain Junkerfjellet, about  straight east of the town of Mo i Rana.

See also
 List of lakes in Norway
 Geography of Norway

References

Rana, Norway
Lakes of Nordland